Bite Your Tongue  is the debut solo album by Australian singer-songwriter Tiffani Wood. It was released in Australia on 14 October 2006 through Wood's own independent record label Mudhoney Records.

Album information 
The album was recorded over two years during 2005 and 2006, excluding "The Mirror" which was originally released in 2004 as a b-side to Wood's debut solo single on Warner Music, "What R U Waiting 4". All songs on the album are co-written by Wood, excluding the Divinyls cover of "I Touch Myself". The record takes an uptempo pop rock approach, covering a number of themes such as relationships ("Spin the Bottle", "I Told You", "Ain't Dun Nothing To U"), falling asleep behind the wheel ("Wake Up"), body image ("The Mirror") and the entertainment industry ("Devil in Your Soul", "Free Your Mind"). The imagery for the booklet and artwork was inspired by Wood's love for the 1940s burlesque look.

Herald Sun music reporter Cameron Adams gave the album three stars, stating, "Wood hasn't got the budget for hot overseas hitmakers, but has a powerful voice and never sounds out of depth amid heavy guitars...In a word: sassy".

Track listing 
 "Intro (Phone Talk)" – 0:30
 "Devil in Your Soul" (T. Wood, R. Goncalves) – 3.41
 "Spin the Bottle" (T. Wood, E. Sherlock) – 2.59
 "I Touch Myself" (C. Amphlett, M. Mcentee, B. Steinberg, T. Kelly) – 3.25
 "Wake Up" (T. Wood, E. Sherlock) – 3.31
 "The Mirror" (T. Wood, J. Kempster) – 3.47
 "I Told You" (T. Wood, S. Hawksley) – 3.35
 "9 Lives" (T. Wood, P. Wiltshire, M. Stangel) – 3.22
 "Ain't Dun Nuthin' To U" (T. Wood, R. Goncalves) – 3:19
 "Head" (T. Wood, A. Dahal) – 3:15
 "Free Your Mind" (T. Wood, A. Dahal) – 3:15

Production credits 
 Tracks 1, 2, 3, 4, 5, 7, 8, 10, 11 produced by Richie Goncalves
 Track 9 produced and mixed by Paul Wiltshire and Michael Strangel for PLW Productions
 Track 6 produced and mixed by Tony Cvetkovski
 Tracks 4, 5, 7, 9, 11 mixed by James Katski
 Tracks 2, 3, 10 mixed by Peter Mayes
 Tracks 1, 4, 5, 7, 8, 9, 11 mastered by Rick O'Neil
 Tracks 2, 3, 10 mastered by Steve Smart
 Track 8 mastered by David Macquarie

Singles

References

External links 
 

2006 debut albums
Tiffani Wood albums